Gerontha is a genus of moths belonging to the family Tineidae.

Species
Gerontha acrosthenia Zagulajev, 1972
Gerontha akahatii Moriuti, 1989
Gerontha albidicomans Moriuti, 1989
Gerontha ampliptera Ponomarenko & Park, 1996
Gerontha borea Moriuti, 1977
Gerontha capna Diakonoff, 1968
Gerontha captiosella Walker, 1864 
Gerontha diascopa Diakonoff, 1968
Gerontha dolichophallica Moriuti, 1989
Gerontha dracuncula Meyrick, 1928 (= Gerontha siroii Moriuti, 1989)
Gerontha flexura G.H. Huang, Hirowatari & M. Wang, 2006
Gerontha hoenei Petersen, 1987
Gerontha hyalina Moriuti, 1989
Gerontha melanopalpalis Moriuti, 1989
Gerontha monostigma Diakonoff, 1968
Gerontha namhaensis Ponomarenko & Park, 1996
Gerontha navapuriensis Moriuti, 1989
Gerontha nivicaput Diakonoff, 1968
Gerontha opaca Moriuti, 1989
Gerontha rostriformis H.H. Li & Y.L. Xiao, 2009
Gerontha rugulosa H.H. Li & Y.L. Xiao, 2009
Gerontha siamensis Moriuti, 1989
Gerontha similihoenei H.H. Li & Y.L. Xiao, 2009
Gerontha stheacra Zagulajev, 1972
Gerontha sumihiroi Moriuti, 1989
Gerontha thailandiae Moriuti, 1989
Gerontha trapezia H.H. Li & Y.L. Xiao, 2009
Gerontha tudai Moriuti, 1989

References

Myrmecozelinae